Sot or SOT may refer to:

Mathematics, science, and technology 
 Small-outline transistor
 Society of Toxicology, U.S.
 Sound on tape, in television broadcasting
 Strong operator topology, in mathematics

Places 
 Sot (village), Vojvodina, Serbia
 Sodankylä Airfield, Sodankylä, Lapland, Finland, IATA code
 Stoke-on-Trent railway station, England, station code

Other uses 
 Sotho language, a Bantu language of South Africa, ISO 639 code
 Special Occupational Taxpayers, some US Firearm Licensees
 Gamasot or sot, a Korean cauldron
 Gazeta Sot, a daily newspaper in Albania

See also 
 Sots (disambiguation)